Wild Pink is an American indie rock band from the boroughs of Brooklyn and Queens in New York City.

History
Wild Pink began in 2015, releasing an EP titled 2 Songs. In May 2015, Wild Pink joined Texas Is Funny Records and released a new single, as well as announcing a second EP, Good Life, which was released on June 30, 2015. In 2016, the band announced their self-titled debut full-length album, which was released on the Tiny Engines label in February 2017. The band's second album, Yolk in the Fur, was released on July 20, 2018. The band's third album, A Billion Little Lights, was released on February 19, 2021, with Royal Mountain Records. Two months later, in April 2021, the band released the EP 6 Cover Songs, which includes cover to songs by Taylor Swift, Coldplay, Bruce Springsteen, and a cover of the Jeopardy! theme tune.

Band members

Current 
John Ross (vocals, guitar)
Arden Yonkers (bass)
Dan Keegan (drums)
Mike Brenner (steel guitar)

Discography

EPs 
 2 Songs (2015, self-released)
 Good Life (2015, Texas Is Funny)
 4 Songs (2016, Tiny Engines)
 5 Songs (2019, Tiny Engines)
6 Cover Songs (2021, Royal Mountain Records)

Studio albums 
 Wild Pink (2017, Tiny Engines)
 Yolk in the Fur (2018, Tiny Engines)
 A Billion Little Lights (2021, Royal Mountain Records)
 ILYSM (2022, Royal Mountain Records)

Music videos

References

External links 
 
 

American power pop groups
2015 establishments in New York City
Musical groups established in 2015
Tiny Engines artists